K252 pipe is a diamondiferous diatreme in the Buffalo Head Hills kimberlite field of Northern Alberta, Canada. It is thought to have formed about 
85 million years ago when this part of Alberta was volcanically active during the Late Cretaceous period. It contains pyroclastic textures and is intruded into Cenomanian and Albian aged strata.

See also
List of volcanoes in Canada
Volcanism of Canada
Volcanism of Western Canada

References

Buffalo Head Hills kimberlite field